Mill Creek is a stream in Johnson County, Iowa, in the United States.

Mill Creek was named from the presence of a saw mill, built in 1839.

See also
List of rivers of Iowa

References

Rivers of Johnson County, Iowa
Rivers of Iowa